The following people have served as High Commissioners or Ambassadors from India to Pakistan. Pakistan vacated its membership in the Commonwealth of Nations from January 1972 until August 1989. From 1999 until 2004, and during 2007-2008, Pakistan was suspended from the Commonwealth of Nations.

List of High Commissioners to Pakistan

High Commissioners of India to the Dominion of Pakistan (1947-1956)

High Commissioners of India to the Islamic Republic of Pakistan (1956-1971)

(Suspension of diplomatic relations following the 1971 Indo-Pakistani War)

Ambassadors of India to the Islamic Republic of Pakistan (1976-1989)

High Commissioners of India to the Islamic Republic of Pakistan (1989-1999)

Ambassadors of India to the Islamic Republic of Pakistan (1999-2004)

High Commissioners of India to the Islamic Republic of Pakistan (2004-2007)

Ambassadors of India to the Islamic Republic of Pakistan (2007-2008)

High Commissioners of India to the Islamic Republic of Pakistan (2008-present)

Notes

External links
  Ambassadors to Pakistan

References 

Pakistan
 
India and the Commonwealth of Nations
Pakistan and the Commonwealth of Nations
India